Luca Poma (Turin, 16 February 1972) is an Italian journalist, university professor, writer, and political adviser, having served as an adviser to the Italian Minister of Foreign Affairs Giulio Terzi di Sant'Agata.

Biography
Poma began his career in 1990. In 1994, he was appointed as a member of the Regional Youth Committee. In 1995 he was the press officer for Amnesty International for northwest Italy. In 2012, during the Sixteenth Legislative period, he was the adviser to the Foreign Minister Giulio Terzi di Sant'Agata, a role he has kept even after the Minister's resignation in 2013. He worked alongside the diplomat Giulio Terzi di Sant'Agata in delivering initiatives on human rights, on climate change, COVID-19 pandemic intervention, and on the rule of law.

In 2013, he published Caro Ministro (Dear Minister), published by the Ministry of Foreign Affairs in Rome. The book included a detailed interview of foreign minister Giulio Terzi di Sant'Agata. The book retraced a full year of Italian foreign politics under Terzi.<ref>Poma, L. (2013). Caro Ministro, Roma, Ministero degli Affari Esteri.</ref>

In 2016, he became teacher of a department at LUMSA, where he teaches at the first chair in reputation management established in Italy.  In 2017, he became a department chairman at the University of Bologna and at the University of the Republic of San Marino. He also lectured on Health Systems and Traditional Medicine at the University of Milano-Bicocca.

Poma was also present in the "red zone" during the Notre-Dame de Paris fire on April 15, 2019.

As a journalist, Poma has contributed to news publications and organizations such as Linkiesta, Sky TG24, Ferpi News, Coach Magazine, and Etica News.

Controversies relating to Scientology
By his own admission, Poma attended the Church of Scientology in the 1990s. However, he later dissociated himself with an open letter with which he criticised the actions of the organization, giving interviews on national media"Scientology/"Ecco come funziona la Chiesa". L'intervista di Affari a Luca Poma - Affaritaliani.it". www.affaritaliani.it. Retrieved 2021-02-03. about his public dissociation with the Church of Scientology. Later, Poma alleged that he had been the target of smear tactics, denouncing harassment against him by anonymous people.

Selected publications
Federico Bianchi di Castelbianco e Luca Poma, Giù le mani dai bambini: iperattività, depressione ed altre moderne malattie, Rome, Edizioni Scientifiche Magi, 2007, .
Cristian Carrara e Luca Poma, Giovani politica futuro, Brescia, Editrice La Scuola, 2010, .
Luca Poma, Creatori di futuro, Rome, Edizioni Scientifiche Magi, 2010, .
Luca Poma, Obiettivo Terra, Rome, Magi Edizioni, 2010, .
Luca Poma, Obiettivo Terra vol.2, Rome, Magi Edizioni, 2011, .
Luca Poma, Alberto Crapanzano, Marila Sarduy, Il Cubano che parla con gli occhi. Cuba attraverso gli scatti di Alex Castro – Foto, impressioni e racconti di vita, Rome, Magi Edizioni,2011, .
Luca Poma e Giampiero Vecchiato, Crisis Management: la Guida del Sole 24 Ore alla comunicazione di crisi, Milan, Edizioni Il Sole 24 Ore, 2012, .
Pier Mario Brava, Ervin Laszlo, Il senso ritrovato, Berlino, Springer International Publisher Science, 2012, Chapter edited by Luca Poma.
Luca Poma, Two lives, one destiny, Rome, Edizioni Scientifiche Magi, 2012, .
Luca Poma, Caro Ministro, Rome, Ministero degli Affari Esteri, 2013.
Stefano Martello e Biagio Oppi, Disastri naturali: una comunicazione responsabile? Modelli, casi reali e opportunità nella comunicazione di crisi, Bologna, Bononia University Press, 2016, Chapter edited by Luca Poma.
Luca Poma, Il sex appeal dei Corpi Digitali, Milan, Franco Angeli Editore, 2016, ."Miracolo Italiano del 23/07/2016". Rai. Retrieved 2021-02-03.
Luca Poma, Salviamo Gian Burrasca, Florence, Terra Nuova Edizioni, .Leggere: tutti, Redazione. ""Salviamo Gian Burrasca". Al Salone del libro Luca Poma con il primo volume al mondo dotato di ecocalcolatore" (in Italian). Retrieved 2021-02-03.
Luca Poma, Apri la tua mente. Pensiero circolare e nuovi percorsi all'interno delle organizzazioni sociali complesse, Padua, Edizioni Libreria Universitaria, .
Patrick Trancu, Lo stato in crisi - Pandemia, caos e domande per il futuro, Milan, 2021, Franco Angeli editore, Chapter edited by Luca Poma.
VV.AA, L'inclusione scolastica in Italia. Percorsi, riflessioni e prospettive future, Trento 2021, Centro Studi Erickson, Chapter edited by Luca Poma.
VV.AA, Governare le crisi per il rilancio aziendale. Lezioni manageriali e il caso Veneto''. Venice 2021, Marsilio, . Chapter edited by Luca Poma.
Luca Poma e Giorgia Grandoni, Il Reputation Management spiegato semplice, Turin 2021, Celid Edizioni, .
Arturo di Corinto and Luca Poma, #Cryptomania. Tra token e blockchain viaggio nell'economia immateriale. Milan 2021, Hoepli , .
Luca Poma, Giorgia Grandoni e Luca "Yuri" Toselli, #Influencer Come nascono i miti del web, Bologna 2021, Fausto Lupetti Editore, ISBN 978-88-8391-437-9.

References

External links

1972 births
Living people
Italian journalists
Academic staff of the Libera Università Maria SS. Assunta